Rush James "R. J." Archer II (born August 5, 1987) is a former American football quarterback. He went undrafted in the 2010 NFL Draft, afterwards signing with the Minnesota Vikings of the National Football League (NFL).

High school
Archer was a three-year starter at Albemarle High School. He holds the school's record for passing yards (4,568), touchdown passes (41), completions, and attempts.

College
Archer enrolled at The College of William & Mary and was redshirted his first year, during which time he ran the scout team. During the 2006 and 2007 seasons, he changed positions from quarterback to wide receiver, where he totaled 69 receptions.  In 2008, he moved back to quarterback, but was not the full-time starter until the 2009 season when he threw for 16 touchdowns and nine interceptions.

College career statistics

Professional career
Archer was rated the 17th best quarterback in the 2010 NFL Draft by NFLDraftScout.com.

Archer went undrafted in the 2010 NFL Draft, but was signed by the Vikings as an undrafted free agent.  He was released prior to training camp on June 29.  On November 10, 2010, Archer signed with the Spokane Shock of the Arena Football League.

With injuries to Vikings quarterbacks Brett Favre and Joe Webb, Minnesota re-signed him to the practice squad on December 7.  He was subsequently placed on the Other League Exempt list by the Spokane Shock.  He was elevated to the Vikings' 53-man roster on December 20 when quarterback Tarvaris Jackson was placed on injured reserve.  He took the roster spot of guard Steve Hutchinson.  The  next day, it was reported that Archer was waived by the Vikings in favor of quarterback Rhett Bomar, who was signed off the practice squad of the New York Giants.

Archer played for the Milwaukee Mustangs of the Arena Football League in 2011 and the Georgia Force of the AFL in 2012.

On June 22, 2012, Archer was signed by the Detroit Lions. He was waived on August 23.

On October 11, 2012, Archer was added to the practice roster of the Winnipeg Blue Bombers of the CFL. He was promoted to the active roster on November 1 and played in one game for the Blue Bombers during the 2012 season.

From 2013 to 2014, Archer played for the Jacksonville Sharks of the Arena Football League, recording 104 touchdowns on 5,381 passing yards.

On February 9, 2015, Archer was signed by Seattle Seahawks. He was released on September 5, 2015.

On September 22, 2015, Archer signed with the BC Lions. He was released following the season.

On December 3, 2015, the Sharks activated Archer from the other league exempt list.

AFL statistics

Stats from ArenaFan:

References

External links
Detroit Lions bio

1987 births
Living people
American football quarterbacks
American football wide receivers
Canadian football quarterbacks
American players of Canadian football
Georgia Force players
Milwaukee Mustangs (2009–2012) players
Minnesota Vikings players
Detroit Lions players
William & Mary Tribe football players
Sportspeople from Charlottesville, Virginia
Players of American football from Virginia
Jacksonville Sharks players
Seattle Seahawks players
Winnipeg Blue Bombers players
BC Lions players
Albemarle High School (Virginia) alumni
Players of Canadian football from Virginia